This is a list of notable synagogues in Israel. Only those that have Wikipedia entries are included here.

Center District

 Great Synagogue (Petah Tikva)
 Yeshurun Central Synagogue (Gedera)

Haifa District

Congregation Emet v'Shalom (Nahariya)
Ohel Ya'akov Synagogue  (Zikhron Ya'akov)

Jerusalem District

North District
Abuhav synagogue (Safed)
Ari Ashkenazi Synagogue (Safed)
Old synagogues of Tiberias (Tiberias)
Or Torah Synagogue (Acre)
Peki'in Synagogue  (Peki'in)
Ramchal Synagogue (Acre)
Shfaram Ancient Synagogue (Shfaram)

Tel Aviv District

Brit Olam Ono, (Kiryat Ono, on Ono Academic College campus)
Cymbalista Synagogue and Jewish Heritage Center, (Tel Aviv)
Great Synagogue (Tel Aviv)
Hechal Yehuda Synagogue (Tel Aviv)

South District

References

 
Synagogues
Israel

External links
Chabad.org: List of Centers in Israel